

Law Schools in the United Republic of Tanzania 

The following are the law schools established on the territory of the United Republic of Tanzania

See also 

Law School of Tanzania

List of universities and colleges in Tanzania

Tanzania Commission for Universities

Institute of Judicial Administration in Lushoto, Tanzania.

References 
 

Law Schools in Tanzania

Universities in Tanzania
Colleges in Tanzania
Universities and colleges in Tanzania